Aaron Martin (born 29 September 1989) is an English professional footballer who plays as a centre-back for  club Eastleigh.

He began his career with non-League club Eastleigh, before turning professional with Southampton in November 2009. He spent time on loan at Conference Premier club Salisbury City towards the end of the 2009–10 campaign, and then played 18 league games across the course of two successive promotions that took Southampton from League One into the Premier League. He spent the 2012–13 season on loan at Crystal Palace and Coventry City and after missing the first half of the 2013–14 season through injury, his Southampton contract was ended by mutual consent in January 2014.

He signed with Birmingham City and played eight Championship games, before joining Yeovil Town in June 2014. He rejoined Coventry City on loan in October 2014 and signed permanently with the club three months later. Released by Coventry, he signed with Oxford United in June 2016, where he would remain for two years before moving on to Exeter City. He played for Exeter in the 2020 League Two play-off final, which ended in defeat. He signed with Hamilton Academical of the Scottish Premiership in November 2020 and returned to England at the end of the 2020–21 campaign to sign for Port Vale. He helped the club to win promotion out of League Two via the play-offs in 2022, before returning the South of England later in the summer to rejoin Eastleigh.

Early life
Martin was born in Newport, Isle of Wight, and attended Heathfield School and Itchen College in Southampton, Hampshire. He represented the English Schools' under-18 football team on several occasions. He had two unsuccessful trials with Southampton at under-12 level.

Career

Eastleigh
Martin began his career with Conference South club Eastleigh as a 14-year-old, having been tracked by the management team of Ian Baird and Mark Dennis. He had a trial with AFC Bournemouth at the age of 19. He scored his first career goal on 27 January 2009, in a 2–0 win over Bath City at Ten Acres. He scored again four days later, in a 4–0 victory at Dorchester Town, and agreed a new contract with the club. He ended the 2008–09 season with three goals in 27 appearances, and played both legs of the club's play-off semi-final defeat to Hayes & Yeading United. He signed a new two-year contract in September 2009 and featured alongside Tom Jordan another 14 times in the early stages of the 2009–10 campaign, scoring one goal in a 6–1 win over Bromley.

Southampton
Following a trial spell he joined League One club Southampton on 4 November 2009 for "an undisclosed five-figure sum, plus appearance and sell-on increments", and signed an 18-month contract; he was recommended to the club by Eastleigh manager Ian Baird, a former striker for the Saints. The club were looking for a partner for established centre-back Radhi Jaïdi, and would also sign José Fonte and Danny Seaborne two months later. After playing in Southampton's reserve team, Martin signed on loan for Conference Premier side Salisbury City in March 2010. The loan was extended to the end of the 2009–10 season, and Martin made 15 appearances and scored once for Tommy Widdrington's Whites, in a 3–1 win against Ebbsfleet United on 2 April, before returning to Southampton in late April. On 1 May, Martin made his debut first-team appearance for the Saints, starting alongside Fonte in the centre of defence against Gillingham in the penultimate game of the season. Southampton manager Alan Pardew said he thought Martin was his team's best player in the game, adding that "he passed it well and looked comfortable in the shirt". He also started the final game of the season, against Southend United, playing alongside Jaïdi.

Martin started just four league games in the 2010–11 campaign, as new manager Nigel Adkins preferred to partner Fonte and Jaïdi, with Seaborne as back-up. Southampton went on to win promotion into the Championship as runners-up of League One. He committed to a new three-year deal with Southampton ahead of the 2011–12 season. Again partnering Fonte, he played the whole of Southampton's first game of the new season, against Leeds United. His first goal in the Football League proved to be the matchwinner in a 2–1 victory over Coventry City in the third round of the FA Cup on 7 January, and in February, he came on as a half-time substitute against Derby County to score his first league goal, Southampton's second in a 4–0 win. He made seven league starts and 17 appearances across all competitions as Southampton were promoted to the Premier League in second-place.

After Japan international Maya Yoshida was signed, Martin then moved out to Championship club Crystal Palace on loan for the 2012–13 season. Manager Dougie Freedman said that he had watched Martin since his time at Eastleigh and saw him "playing a major role in our continued progress". He played five matches in his first month at Selhurst Park, but then played only once more after Ian Holloway replaced Freedman as the Crystal Palace manager, and the loan was cancelled by mutual agreement in January 2013. The following month Martin was again loaned out, this time to League One side Coventry City, where he played regularly until the end of the season. He impressed Coventry boss Steven Pressley, who named him as a top transfer target for the summer once the transfer embargo placed on the Ricoh Arena club was lifted.

The signing of another centre-back, Dejan Lovren, pushed Martin down to fifth-choice centre-back at St Mary's and an injury sustained in pre-season kept Martin out of action until January 2014. His contract with Southampton was ended by mutual consent on 28 January as he was not part of manager Mauricio Pochettino's first-team plans.

Birmingham City
Two days after his release, he joined Championship club Birmingham City on a short-term deal until the end of the 2013–14 season, after manager Lee Clark had Dan Burn and Kyle Bartley recalled from their loan spells. He made his debut at St Andrew's on 1 February, coming off the bench after 14 minutes to replace the injured Tom Thorpe, in a 3–3 draw with Derby County. He played infrequently, making the last of his eight appearances on 29 March, and was released when his contract expired.

Yeovil Town
Following his release from Birmingham, Martin signed for League One side Yeovil Town on a two-year contract on 4 June 2014. He made his debut in the Glovers 3–0 opening-day defeat to Doncaster Rovers at Huish Park. He scored a brace on 6 September, in a 3–1 win at Bradford City. Martin commented after the game that manager Gary Johnson had ordered him to be more aggressive at set pieces and the advice had paid off.

Coventry City
On 29 October 2014, Martin joined fellow League One side Coventry City on loan until 5 January, in a deal which saw Jordan Clarke move in the other direction. Martin was released from his Yeovil contract and signed for Coventry permanently on an 18-month contract on 9 January. He ended the 2014–15 season with 28 appearances for Coventry, in addition to his 14 appearances for Yeovil. He recovered from an ankle injury to play 32 games in the 2015–16 campaign, scoring two goals, as Coventry finished two places outside of the play-off places. He was named as the Football League Unsung Hero of the Month for January after making several visits to schools in deprived areas around Coventry and donating £1,000 to a children's charity. In May 2016, manager Tony Mowbray opted to release Martin at the end of his contract due to his lack of aggression, citing it as his most difficult decision of the summer.

Oxford United
On 25 June 2016, Martin joined League One club Oxford United on a two-year contract, citing manager Michael Appleton's style of play as a factor in his move to the Kassam Stadium. On 8 November, he took part in the longest penalty shoot-out in English professional football history, as Oxford were beaten 13–12 by Chelsea U23's in the Football League Trophy; Martin missed his penalty when the scores were level at 7–7. He struggled with minor injuries and was limited to 11 appearances in the first half of the 2016–17 campaign, before a ruptured Achilles tendon in December ruled him out for the remainder of the season. New manager Pep Clotet had stated that Martin would be one of four centre-backs in the 2017–18 season, along with Mike Williamson, Curtis Nelson and Charlie Raglan. However John Mousinho was signed at the end of August. Martin was limited to ten league starts and nine other appearances and was released by new manager Karl Robinson.

Exeter City
On 25 June 2018, Martin joined League Two club Exeter City on a free transfer, although his contract length was undisclosed. Manager Matt Taylor cited Martin's character and experience as important factors in bringing him to St James Park. He played 27 matches in the 2018–19 season, scoring three goals, as the Grecians finished one point outside the play-offs. He made 45 appearances in the 2019–20 campaign, scoring three goals, including a goal in the club's 3–2 aggregate play-off semi-final victory over Colchester United. He played at Wembley Stadium in the final, which ended in a 4–0 defeat to Northampton Town, with one of the goals deflecting off his heel into the net. Martin was released by Exeter at the end of his contract in July 2020.

Hamilton Academical
Martin signed for Scottish Premiership club Hamilton Academical on 7 November 2020. Speaking three months later, manager Brian Rice said that he was a "magnificent signing" and had "been everything and much more than I expected" following Gary Warren's recommendation, and praised Martin for not exercising a clause in his contract to end his contract early in January to return to his family home in Southampton. Despite it being a good season for Martin in terms of personal performances as part of a back three, the Accies were relegated in last place in 2020–21. He left New Douglas Park upon the expiry of his contract.

Port Vale
On 9 June 2021, Martin signed an agreement to join English League Two club Port Vale and was described as a "model professional" by manager Darrell Clarke, who cited the player's previous work with assistant manager Andy Crosby at Southampton. He picked up a back injury early in the 2021–22 season, but scored his first goal for the "Valiants" in a 3–0 win over Colchester United at Vale Park on 23 October. He played as a substitute in the play-off final at Wembley Stadium as Vale secured promotion with a 3–0 victory over Mansfield Town. However Martin requested a transfer so that he could remain closer to his family in the South.

Eastleigh
In July 2022, Martin returned to Eastleigh after having left the club 13 years ago; manager Lee Bradbury noted that "he's a local lad coming home". Martin was announced as club captain ahead of the commencement of the 2022–23 season.

Style of play
Martin is a  centre-back. A laid-back individual, he has admitted that he needs to add more aggression to his game and be more dominant in the air. He is a vocal player with good organisational and leadership skills, and is comfortable in possession.

Career statistics

Honours
Port Vale
EFL League Two play-offs: 2022

References

1989 births
Living people
People from Newport, Isle of Wight
Footballers from the Isle of Wight
English footballers
England schools international footballers
Association football defenders
Eastleigh F.C. players
Southampton F.C. players
Salisbury City F.C. players
Crystal Palace F.C. players
Coventry City F.C. players
Birmingham City F.C. players
Yeovil Town F.C. players
Oxford United F.C. players
Exeter City F.C. players
Hamilton Academical F.C. players
Port Vale F.C. players
National League (English football) players
English Football League players
Scottish Professional Football League players